Billy Brown (born March 20, 1993) is a former American football tight end. He played college football at Shepherd.

Professional career

Brown was seen as a late seventh round draft pick in the 2017 NFL Draft. ESPN.com had Brown going in the seventh round, other sports sites also had him listed as a later draft or undrafted prospect coming out of Shepherd University, and signed with the Philadelphia Eagles as an undrafted free agent in 2017.

Philadelphia Eagles
Brown signed with the Philadelphia Eagles as an undrafted free agent on May 11, 2017. He was waived on September 2, 2017 and was signed to the Eagles' practice squad the next day. While Brown was on their practice squad, the Eagles defeated the New England Patriots in Super Bowl LII. He signed a futures contract with the Eagles on February 9, 2018.

On September 1, 2018, Brown was waived by the Eagles and was signed to the practice squad the next day.  He was released on September 10, 2018, but was re-signed on September 20. He was released on November 13, 2018.

Indianapolis Colts
On December 6, 2018, Brown was signed to the Indianapolis Colts practice squad. He signed a future/reserve contract on January 13, 2019.

On August 3, 2019, Brown was waived/injured by the Colts and was placed on injured reserve. He was waived on April 27, 2020.

References

External links
Philadelphia Eagles bio
Shepherd Rams bio

1993 births
Living people
American football tight ends
Indianapolis Colts players
People from Gaithersburg, Maryland
Philadelphia Eagles players
Players of American football from Maryland
Shepherd Rams football players
Sportspeople from Montgomery County, Maryland
Gaithersburg High School alumni